Ana Tena Puy (born 1966) is an Aragonese writer in Ribagorçan Aragonese.

Life
She was born in Panillo, Huesca province, Aragón, Spain.

In 2009, she won Chusé Coarasa, for short stories written in Aragonese.
She is a member of Consello d'a Fabla Aragonesa and a founding member of the Academia de l'Aragonés. In her works, she mixes her personal introspection and social interests.

Books
 Ta óne im Publicazions d'o Consello d'a Fabla Aragonesa, 1997 translated to french "Où allons-nous ?", éditions de la ramonda, 2017
 Tornasols (1997)
 Bardo que alenta, Publicazions d'o Consello d'a Fabla Aragonesa, 1998, 
 La bollonera d’un alma (2001)
 Más t’allá (2002)
 Cuentos pa biladas sin suenio Publicazions d'o Consello d'a Fabla Aragonesa, 2001, 
 L’ombre la santeta, (2005) premio Billa de Sietemo
 Como minglanas, Publicazions d'o Consello d'a Fabla Aragonesa, 2008, 
 Adónde vamos, Gara D'Edizions, 2009,

References

1966 births
Living people
Aragonese writers
Aragonese-language writers
20th-century Spanish women writers
21st-century Spanish women writers
Spanish women poets
20th-century Spanish poets